In materials science, a composite laminate is an assembly of layers of fibrous composite materials which can be joined to provide required engineering properties, including in-plane stiffness, bending stiffness, strength, and coefficient of thermal expansion.

The individual layers consist of high-modulus, high-strength fibers in a polymeric, metallic, or ceramic matrix material.  Typical fibers used include cellulose, graphite, glass, boron, and silicon carbide, and some matrix materials are epoxies, polyimides, aluminium, titanium, and alumina.

Layers of different materials may be used, resulting in a hybrid laminate. The individual layers generally are orthotropic (that is, with principal properties in orthogonal directions) or transversely isotropic (with isotropic properties in the transverse plane) with the laminate then exhibiting anisotropic (with variable direction of principal properties), orthotropic, or quasi-isotropic properties. Quasi-isotropic laminates exhibit isotropic (that is, independent of direction) inplane response but are not restricted to isotropic out-of-plane (bending) response. Depending upon the stacking sequence of the individual layers, the laminate may exhibit coupling between inplane and out-of-plane response. An example of bending-stretching coupling is the presence of curvature developing as a result of in-plane loading.

Classical laminate analysis
Composite laminates may be regarded as a type of plate or thin-shell structure, and as such their stiffness properties may be found by integration of in-plane stress in the direction normal to the laminates surface. The broad majority of ply or lamina materials obey Hooke's law and hence all of their stresses and strains may be related by a system of linear equations. Laminates are assumed to deform by developing three strains of the mid-plane/surface and three changes in curvature

and

where  and  define the co-ordinate system at the laminate level. Individual plies have local co-ordinate axes which are aligned with the materials characteristic directions; such as the principal directions of its elasticity tensor. Uni-directional ply's for example always have their first axis aligned with the direction of the reinforcement. A laminate is a stack of individual plies having a set of ply orientations

which have a strong influence on both the stiffness and strength of the laminate as a whole.  Rotating an anisotropic material results in a variation of its elasticity tensor. If in its local co-ordinates a ply is assumed to behave according to the stress-strain law

then under a rotation transformation (see transformation matrix) it has the modified elasticity terms

Hence

An important assumption in the theory of classical laminate analysis is that the strains resulting from curvature vary linearly in the thickness direction, and that the total in-plane strains are a sum of those derived from membrane loads and bending loads. Hence

Furthermore, a three-dimensional stress field is replaced by six stress resultants; three membrane forces (forces per unit length) and bending moments per unit length. It is assumed that if these three quantities are known at any location (x,y) then the stresses may be computed from them. Once part of a laminate the transformed elasticity is treated as a piecewise function of the thickness direction, hence the integration operation may be treated as the sum of a finite series, giving

where

See also
 Carbon-fiber-reinforced polymer
 Composite material
 High-pressure laminate
 Laminate
 Lay-Up process
 Void (composites)

References

External links
 Advanced Composites Centre for Innovation and Science

Composite materials
Fibre-reinforced polymers